Martin Fuksa (born 30 April 1993) is a Czech sprint canoeist. He competed in the men's C-1 200 metres event at the 2016 Summer Olympics.

Career
Fuksa and his brother Petr represented the Czech Republic together in the men's C-2 1000 metres event at the 2020 Summer Olympics.

Personal life
Fuksa is the son of former canoeist Petr Fuksa, and the brother of Petr Fuksa Jr.

References

External links
 

1993 births
Living people
Czech male canoeists
Olympic canoeists of the Czech Republic
Canoeists at the 2016 Summer Olympics
Canoeists at the 2020 Summer Olympics
ICF Canoe Sprint World Championships medalists in Canadian
People from Nymburk
European Games silver medalists for the Czech Republic
European Games bronze medalists for the Czech Republic
Canoeists at the 2015 European Games
Canoeists at the 2019 European Games
European Games medalists in canoeing
Sportspeople from the Central Bohemian Region